In general relativity, specifically in the Einstein field equations, a spacetime is said to be stationary if it admits a  Killing vector that is asymptotically timelike.

Description and analysis
In a stationary spacetime, the metric tensor components, may be chosen so that they are all independent of the time coordinate. The line element of a stationary spacetime has the form 

 

The latter arises as the spatial components of the twist 4-vector (see, for example, p. 163) which is orthogonal to the Killing vector , i.e., satisfies . The twist vector measures the extent to which the Killing vector fails to be orthogonal to a family of 3-surfaces. A non-zero twist indicates the presence of rotation in the spacetime geometry.

The coordinate representation described above has an interesting geometrical interpretation. The time translation Killing vector generates a one-parameter group of motion  in the spacetime . By identifying the spacetime points that lie on a particular trajectory (also called orbit) one gets a 3-dimensional space (the manifold of Killing trajectories) , the quotient space. Each point of  represents a trajectory in  the spacetime . Thus, the geometry of a stationary spacetime does not change in time. In the special case  the spacetime is said to be static. By definition, every static spacetime is stationary, but the converse is not generally true, as the Kerr metric provides a counterexample.

Use as starting point for vacuum field equations

In a stationary spacetime satisfying the vacuum Einstein equations  outside the sources, the twist 4-vector  is curl-free,

 

and is therefore locally the gradient of a scalar  (called the twist scalar):

 

 
 

In general relativity the mass potential  plays the role of the Newtonian gravitational potential. A nontrivial angular momentum potential  arises for rotating sources due to the rotational kinetic energy which, because of mass–energy equivalence, can also act as the source of a gravitational field. The situation is analogous to a static electromagnetic field where one has two sets of potentials, electric and magnetic.  In general relativity, rotating sources produce a gravitomagnetic field that has no Newtonian analog.

A stationary vacuum metric is thus expressible in terms of the Hansen potentials  and the 3-metric . In terms of these quantities the Einstein vacuum field equations can be put in the form

 
 

These equations form the starting point for investigating exact stationary vacuum metrics.

See also
 Static spacetime
 Spherically symmetric spacetime

References

Lorentzian manifolds